Irish bar may refer to:
 Irish pub, a drinking establishment
 Barristers in Ireland, regulated by the Bar Council of Ireland
 Bar of Northern Ireland regulates Northern Ireland since 1921
 No Irish need apply